Live Over Europe may refer to:

 Live Over Europe (DVD), a 2008 DVD by Axel Rudi Pell
 Live Over Europe (Black Country Communion album)
 Live Over Europe!, an album by Bonfire
 Live over Europe 2007, an album by Genesis